Ubra is a rural locality (a selo) in Kumukshy Selsoviet, Laksky District, Republic of Dagestan, Russia. The population was 44 as of 2010. There is 1 street.

Geography 
Ubra is located 7 km northwest of Kumukh (the district's administrative centre) by road. Kumukh and Khuri are the nearest rural localities.

Nationalities 
Laks live there.

Famous residents 
 Miyasat Muslimova (publicist, translator and literary critic)

References 

Rural localities in Laksky District